The 2022 UCLA men's volleyball team represented University of California, Los Angeles in the 2022 NCAA Division I & II men's volleyball season. The Bruins, led by tenth year head coach John Speraw, played their home games at Pauley Pavilion when basketball did not conflict with the home game schedule and at John Wooden Center when basketball  conflicted with the home game schedule. The Bruins were members of the MPSF and were picked to finish second in the MPSF preseason poll. UCLA hosted the MPSF tournament (April 20-23) and also the 2022 NCAA Championship at Pauley Pavilion. The 2022 NCAA Championship began on May 1 with an opening round match.

Season highlights
 The Bruins defeated rivals USC Trojans twice this season.
 UCLA won the MPSF title by defeating Pepperdine 3–0 on April 9, 2022.
 The team hosted the MPSF and NCAA Tournaments at Pauley Pavilion.

Roster

Schedule
TV/Internet Streaming information:
All home games will be televised on Pac-12 Network or Pac-12+. Most road games will also be streamed by the schools streaming service. The conference tournament will be streamed by FloVolleyball. 

 *-Indicates conference match. (#)-Indicates tournament seeding.
 Times listed are Pacific Time Zone. Rank – American Volleyball Coaches Association (AVCA) Men's Division I-II Coaches Poll. (#) Tournament seedings in parentheses.

Announcers for televised games

Princeton: Denny Cline
Ohio State: Anne Marie Anderson 
Penn State: Denny Cline
CSUN: Denny Cline
Lewis: Denny Cline
UC Irvine: Rob Espero & Charlie Brande
UC Irvine: Denny Cline
UC San Diego: Bryan Fenley & Ricci Luyties
Long Beach State: Matt Brown & Matt Prosser
Long Beach State: Denny Cline
Concordia Irvine: Denny Cline
Concordia Irvine: Patience O'Neal
Grand Canyon: Denny Cline
Grand Canyon: Denny Cline
Stanford: Tim Swartz & Ted Enberg
Stanford: Ted Enberg
USC: Anne Marie Anderson
USC: Anne Marie Anderson
Pepperdine: Al Epstein
Pepperdine: Jim Watson
BYU: Jarom Jordan, Steve Vail & Kiki Solano
BYU: Jarom Jordan, Steve Vail, & Kiki Solano
MPSF Tournament Semifinal- Stanford: Darren Preston
NCAA Opening Round- Pepperdine: Darren Preston
NCAA Semifinal: Brendan Gulick

Rankings

Awards and honors
 March 14, 2022 – Merrick McHenry was the Co-National Middle Attacker of the Week by offtheblock.com and Kevin Kobrine was named the MPSF Defensive Player of the Week
 April 4, 2022 – Miles Partain was named National Setter of the Week and Kevin Kobrine was the MPSF Offensive Player of the Week
 April 11, 2022 – Miles Partain was named MPSF Player of the Week
 April 18, 2022 – Ido David was named MPSF Offensive Player of the Week

References

2022 in sports in California
2022 NCAA Division I & II men's volleyball season
UCLA